Karachi Medical & Dental College is a public medical university in Karachi. It was founded by Naimatullah Khan in 1991.

It offers MBBS and BDS programs at undergraduate level which are accredited by the Pakistan Medical and Dental Council. KMDC also offers postgraduate specialties in medicine and dentistry in affiliation with the College of Physicians and Surgeons Pakistan and University of Karachi.

References

External links
 KMDC official website

Medical colleges in Sindh
Universities and colleges in Karachi
Educational institutions established in 1991
1991 establishments in Pakistan
Public universities and colleges in Sindh